Loiri Porto San Paolo (Gallurese: Lòiri–Poltu Santu Paulu) is a comune (municipality) in the Province of Sassari in the Italian region Sardinia, located about  north of Cagliari and about  south of Olbia.   The administrative centre is Loiri (Gallurese: Lòiri).

Loiri Porto San Paolo borders the following municipalities: Monti, Olbia, Padru, San Teodoro.

References

External links
Official website 

Cities and towns in Sardinia
1979 establishments in Italy
States and territories established in 1979